Trifurcula bupleurella is a moth of the family Nepticulidae. It is found in southern France and the Iberian Peninsula.

The larvae feed on Bupleurum fruticosum and Bupleurum rigidum. They mine the leaves of their host plant. The mine consists of an upper-surface, whitish corridor. It is narrow at first, but considerably widening later. The frass is deposited in a thin black central line. Some mines are contorted and confined to a limited space, others follow a vein and are quite long.

External links
bladmineerders.nl
Fauna Europaea

Nepticulidae
Moths of Europe
Moths described in 1907